Krishan Kumar may refer to:

 Krishan Kumar (sociologist) (born 1942), British sociologist
 Krishan Kumar (actor), Indian film actor and producer
 Krishan Kumar (politician), Indian politician